A barred irregular galaxy is an irregular version of a barred spiral galaxy. Examples include the Large Magellanic Cloud and NGC 6822. Some barred irregular galaxies (like the Large Magellanic Cloud) may be dwarf spiral galaxies, which have been distorted into an irregular shape by tidal interactions with a more massive neighbor.

References

 

Galaxy morphological types